The 1944–45 Irish Cup was the 65th edition of the premier knock-out cup competition in Northern Irish football. 

Linfield won the tournament for the 22nd time, defeating Glentoran 4–2 in the final at Celtic Park.

Results

First round

|}

1 Glentoran II were awarded the tie as Bangor were expelled from the tournament for an infringement of the rules.

Second round

|}

Quarter-finals

|}

Semi-finals

|}

Final

References

External links
 Northern Ireland Cup Finals. Rec.Sport.Soccer Statistics Foundation (RSSSF)

Irish Cup seasons
1944–45 domestic association football cups
1944–45 in Northern Ireland association football